The Van Eyalet was an eyalet of the Ottoman Empire. The capital was Van. It was formed in 1548 as one of the Beylerbeyliks of the Ottoman Empire.

It included territory in Eastern Anatolia, as well as a small part of present-day Iran (the Sanjak of Sero, today in Urmia County).

Administrative divisions
Administrative division of the beylerbeylik of Van between 1680 and 1702 were as follows:
 Sanjak of Van (Paşa Sancağı, Van)
 Government of Bitlis (Bitlis Hükûmeti, Bitlis)
 Government of Hizan (Hizan Hükûmeti, Hizan)
 Government of Hakkâri (Hakkâri Hükûmeti, Hakkâri)
 Government of Hoşab (or Mahmûdî, Hoşab Hükûmeti, Güzelsu) 
 Sanjak of Karkar (Kârkâr Sancağı, Daldere)
 Sanjak of Zeriki (Zeriki Sancağı, Sarıca)
 Sanjak of Şırvî (Şırvî Sancağı)
 Sanjak of Müküs (Müküs Sancağı, Bahçesaray)
 Sanjak of Şıtak (Şıtak Sancağı, Çatak)
 Sanjak of Albak (Albak Sancağı, Başkale)
 Sanjak of Ispaghird (Espayrid Sancağı, Sürücüler) 
 Sanjak of Erdjish or Arjis (Erciş Sancağı, Erciş) 
 Sanjak of Keshan (Késan Sancağı, Ergeçidi)
 Sanjak of Adil Djevaz (Adilcevâz Sancağı, Adilcevaz) 
 Sanjak of Aghakis (Ağakis Sancağı, Göllü)
 Sanjak of Bargeri (Bargiri Sancağı, Muradiye)
 Sanjak of Diyadin (Diyadin Sancağı, Diyadin)
 Sanjak of Somay (Somay Sancağı, Sero)
 Sanjak of Harun (Harûn Sancağı, Güzelkonak)

References

Eyalets of the Ottoman Empire in Anatolia
1548 establishments in the Ottoman Empire
1864 disestablishments in the Ottoman Empire